Masashi Yokoi (横井 昌志, Yokoi Masashi, 29 October 1982, Gifu) is a Japanese professional drifter, he currently competing in D1 Grand Prix and win the championship in 2018, 2019 and 2022 making him the second driver to win back-to-back championship. he is nicknamed as Zombie Yokoi or Galaxy Yokoi

Career
Yokoi gained D1 license after competing and winning in Ikaten event and started to competing in D1 Street Legal in 2007 with Nissan Silvia S15 he nicknamed Zombie after he still able to run his car despite crashing in to the wall during practice and solo run. he also debuted in D1 Grand Prix and advanced to the Top 16 for the first time in round 6 the following year. in 2009 he won his first D1 Street Legal win in final round, 3 years later still competing in D1SL he won three time during the season and winning the championship while racing for D-MAX in D1GP.

From 2013 he began to compete full time in D1GP and won his first round the following year in round 5 at Ebisu Circuit defeating that season eventual champion Kuniaki Takahashi and finished 3rd in final standings of 2014 season.

In 2015 he competed in Formula Drift USA with support from Yokohama tires and get one win on his only season in the competition and nicknamed Galaxy Yokoi. while silmutaneusly compete in D1GP.

In 2016 he switched to a 2JZ powered S15 built by his shop and following year in 2017 he and his team switch tire from Yokohama to Nankang after Yokohama pulled out from D1GP, he finished second in D1GP with 2 wins missing out on title in the final round of the season. along with D1GP he also compete in Formula Drift Japan with the same car he drive in USA for 2016 and his D1 car in 2017. In the end pf the season he competes in first ever FIA Intercontinental Drift CuP.

In 2018 he turn his Formula Drift S15 into his new D1 car now equipped with 2JZ engine while his previous car was driven by his teammate Akira Hirajima. despite Masato Kawabata domination in Solo Run Yokoi managed to get 3 wins throughout the season and grabbed his first championship in final round after Kawabata defeated in Top 16.

In 2019 He win the first two-round followed by 2 more podium in the series, despite not scoring any points in the remaining round he hanging on to the championship lead and claimed his second title making him the second driver after Youichi Imamura to win back-to-back title in D1GP and winning it in same car he previously win the championship in.

In 2020 season he debuted the his fourth S15 Silvia which is an upgrade from his previous car which going to be driven by Masao Suenaga who returmed after competing as privateer in 2019, finished second in the standings but managed to be Solo Run Champion.

2021 he win at round 2 and finished second again in the championship. he is also doing stunt drive for movie Alivehoon alongside other D1 driver such as Naoki Nakamura and Yusuke Kitaoka

After two years finishing as runner-up, he won his third D1GP title in the final round of the 2022 season equaling Masato Kawabata's tally and became the third person to win three or more titles.

Personal life
Yokoi currently lives in Ichinomiya, Aichi while running his own shop MCR Factory (MCR stands for Mind Control Racing) where he built and maintained his D1GP cars and also fielded a team in D1 Lights. he has hobby of Jet Ski which he often do in his free time, he has two children.

Complete drifting results

References 

1982 births
Living people
Drifting drivers
Japanese racing drivers
Sportspeople from Gifu Prefecture
D1 Grand Prix drivers
People from Ichinomiya, Aichi